Ove Robert Aunli (born 12 March 1956 in Hemne) is a Norwegian former cross-country skier. He took the Olympic bronze medal in 1980 Lake Placid when Thomas Wassberg beat Juha Mieto by one-hundredth of a second for the gold medal, and won a silver medal as part of Norway's 4 × 10 km relay team.

Aunli found his biggest success at the FIS Nordic World Ski Championships, winning six medals. This included two golds (4 × 10 km: 1982, 1985), one silver (30 km: 1985), and three bronzes (4 × 10 km: 1978, 1987; 50 km: 1985).

Aunli represented the clubs Kyrksæterøra IL and Strindheim IL.

He is married to Berit Aunli.

Cross-country skiing results
All results are sourced from the International Ski Federation (FIS).

Olympic Games
 2 medals – (1 silver, 1 bronze)

World Championships
 6 medals – (2 gold, 1 silver, 3 bronze)

World Cup

Season standings

Individual podiums
 1 victory 
 5 podiums

Team podiums

 2 victories 
 5 podiums

Note:  Until the 1999 World Championships, World Championship races were included in the World Cup scoring system.

References

External links
 

1956 births
Living people
Norwegian male cross-country skiers
Olympic cross-country skiers of Norway
Olympic silver medalists for Norway
Olympic bronze medalists for Norway
Cross-country skiers at the 1980 Winter Olympics
Cross-country skiers at the 1984 Winter Olympics
People from Hemne
Olympic medalists in cross-country skiing
FIS Nordic World Ski Championships medalists in cross-country skiing
Medalists at the 1980 Winter Olympics
Sportspeople from Trøndelag